Jeg har el sket og levet is a 1940 Danish family film directed by George Schnéevoigt. The film stars Erling Schroeder and Johannes Meyer.

Cast
Erling Schroeder as C.E.F. Weyse 
Ellen Gottschalch as Henriette Frisch 
Johannes Meyer as Tutein 
Mary Alice Therp as Lucia Tutein 
Bjarne Forchhammer as Friederich Tutein 
Tove Bang as Pauline Tutein 
Inger Stender as Emilie Tutein 
Edith Oldrup Pedersen as Julie Tutein 
Aksel Schiøtz as Herman Kramer 
Angelo Bruun as Wilhelm Nolthenius 
Edvin Tiemroth as Adam Oehlenschläger 
Børge Munch Petersen as Knud Lyhne Rahbek 
Karen Lykkehus as Kamma Rahbek 
Hans Kurt as du Puy 
Carl Viggo Meincke as Kofoed 
Asmund Rostrup as Søren Hertz 
Thorkil Lauritzen as Buntzen 
Victor Montell as Tørring 
Kristian as Hans Søstersøn 
Carl Madsen as a coachman

References

External links
 

1940s Danish-language films
1940 films
Danish black-and-white films
Films directed by George Schnéevoigt
1940 drama films
Danish drama films
Adam Oehlenschläger